Events from the year 1994 in North Korea.

Incumbents
Premier: Kang Song-san 
Supreme Leader: Kim Il-sung (until 8 July), Kim Jong-il (starting 8 July)

Events
January - October 1994: 1994 North Korean nuclear crisis;
October 1994: Signing of the Agreed Framework between North Korea and the United States;
December 1994: North Koreans shoot down US Army helicopter. One US KIA and one US POW for 13 days;
 North Korean famine

Deaths

 July 8 - Kim Il-sung.

References

 
North Korea
1990s in North Korea
Years of the 20th century in North Korea
North Korea